Ancien Bakani is a village in the Lobaye region in the Central African Republic southwest of the capital, Bangui and near the border with the Democratic Republic of the Congo.

References

Populated places in Lobaye